SWAS may become:

 Steam and water analysis system
 Submillimeter Wave Astronomy Satellite